The Australian Labor Party (Australian Capital Territory Branch), commonly known as ACT Labor, is the ACT branch of the Australian Labor Party. It is one of two major parties in the unicameral Parliament of the Australian Capital Territory.

Originally a part of the Australian Labor Party (New South Wales Branch), the ALP National Conference established an autonomous ACT Branch in 1973. There have been four Labor Chief Ministers since self-government in 1989. The most recent is the current Chief Minister, Andrew Barr, who has served since 2014.

The current ACT Labor Platform notes that the objective of the party is social justice and the pursuit of a fair, just and equitable society.

History

Pre-1973 Autonomy (1930–1973)

In 1930, the first ACT ALP Branch was established as part of the NSW party. The first meeting was held at the Friendly Society's hall at Kingston. The party endorsed candidates for the Advisory Council and also for the Canberra Community Hospital Board.

In 1931, the Branch called a meeting of trade union representatives which resulted in the formation of the ACT Trades and Labour Council. During the 1940s the party continued to grow. It met monthly in either the Civic or Kingston Hotels.

The party lobbied for federal representation and in 1949, Canberrans elected their first federal member. Initially an independent was elected but shortly after Jim Fraser won the seat for the ALP. Fraser held the seat for 19 years until his death. However he was limited to voting only on Territorial matters until 1966.

In 1951, a second ACT Branch was established in Jervis Bay. A South Canberra Branch was established in 1957 which led to the establishment of a Canberra Federal Electorate Council of the NSW Branch.

1968 saw a challenge to the preselection of Jim Fraser within the ALP. The issue was the Vietnam War and it involved a North-South split. The contender Gordon Walsh won the preselection, but this was later overturned by the NSW Branch.

During this time the Australian National University was a major source of members of the party and various academics were active participants in its affairs. For example, in 1968 the Canberra City (North) Branch had 118 members of which 13 were undergraduates, 14 were postgraduate students and 10 were academics.

Pre-Self Government (1973–1989)

In 1973 the ALP National Conference established an autonomous ACT Branch and the present structure was established. The ACT electorate was divided into two electorates of Canberra and Fraser (after Jim Fraser not Malcolm) and two Senate positions were established in 1974.

The women's movement has exerted a strong influence on the ACT Branch. In 1974 Susan Ryan was preselected for the Senate and the Branch has a history of electing women as its candidates and party officials. Joan Taggart from the ACT Branch was elected junior vice-president of the ALP in 1979, thereby becoming the first woman to hold a national office bearer post in the Labor Party. In 1983 Ryan became the first Labor woman Federal Minister. In 1987 Ros Kelly became the first Labor woman Federal Minister in the House of Representatives. In 1989, Rosemary Follett became the first woman Chief Minister or Premier of any State or Territory in Australia, and then the first woman in Australia's history to attend the Premiers Conference.

While Canberra has largely been an exclusively Federal concern it has nevertheless had a partial elected Advisory Council since 1930. The ALP has endorsed candidates to the different versions of this body since its inception. In 1974 the Advisory Council was replaced by a fully elected advisory body titled the Legislative Assembly. In the first elections the ALP won only 4 out of the 18 positions.

The Federal Liberal Government held a referendum on self-government in 1978. The referendum was conducted in such a way as to ensure a negative outcome. Following the referendum, the ACT House of Assembly was created which had similar advisory powers to the old Legislative Assembly. In the 1979 and 1982 elections Labor won 8 of the 18 positions.

ACT Self-Government (Post–1989)

The House of Assembly was abolished in 1987 to make way for a self-governing body. A fully autonomous Legislative Assembly was finally established in 1989 and Labor captured 5 of the 17 positions. As Labor was the largest party, Rosemary Follett, the Labor Assembly Leader, was able to form the first government. Rosemary Follett held office for 7 months until a coalition of Liberals and others organised a spill.

Labor re-took power in June 1991 after a successful no-confidence motion was moved against the Liberal-Residents Rally Alliance Government. ACT Elections were held in February 1992 and Labor was returned to power with the number of MLAs increased from five to eight, only one short of majority Government. After the 1995 and 1998 elections Labor formed the Opposition to a minority Liberal Government.

Labor won back Government on 20 October 2001 and retained government at the elections held in 2004, 2008, 2012, 2016 and 2020. Labor's election win in 2004 was particularly significant as it was the first and, so far, only time a single party has won a majority in the ACT's Legislative Assembly.

List of parliamentary leaders

Advisory Council 

 Gordon Walsh (1967 – October 1974)

House of Assembly 

 Gordon Walsh (October 1974 – January 1977)
 Peter Vallee (January 1977 – April 1982)
 Robyn Walmsley (April 1982 – June 1982) (acting)
 Ken Doyle (June 1982 – March 1983)
 Maurene Horder (March 1983 – June 1985)
 Paul Whalan (June 1985 – June 1986)

Legislative Assembly

Territory election results

References

ACT branch
ACT branch
Political parties in the Australian Capital Territory